Pench may refer to:

 Pench National Park, Madhya Pradesh, India
 Pench Tiger Reserve, Madhya Pradesh, India
 Pench River, India
 Pench Kanhan Coalfield, Madhya Pradesh, India